Inupamula is a village of Kethepally mandal in the Nalgonda district of Telangana, India.

References

Villages in Nalgonda district